Moe Dunford (born 11 December 1987) is an Irish actor. He is best known for his roles in Vikings and Patrick's Day. He is the recipient of a number of accolades, including three Irish Film & Television Awards.

Early life
Dunford was born in Dungarvan, County Waterford, Ireland. He graduated from the Gaiety School of Acting in June 2009.

Career
Dunford started his acting career in 2010 on The Tudors. Afterwards he appeared in many films and TV productions like An Crisis and Game of Thrones. His most notable roles are Aethelwulf  on Vikings and Patrick Fitzgerald in Patrick's Day. In 2015, he received an IFTA in the category of Best Actor in a Lead Role in Film for Patrick's Day, and an EFP  2015 Shooting Stars Award representing Ireland at the Berlin Film Festival.

Filmography

Film

Television

Music Videos

Awards and nominations

References

External links
 

Living people
1987 births
21st-century Irish male actors
Irish male film actors
People from Dungarvan